Libnan, a variant of Lubnan (Arabic), Lebanon (English) or Liban (French). 

Libnan may also refer to:

"Libnan" (Lydia Canaan song), 1993
Ya Libnan, a Lebanese portal journalism

See also
Saydet Libnan, or Our Lady of Lebanon, a Marian shrine and a pilgrimage site in Lebanon